Jin Huiqin (25 February 1933 – 3 April 2022), known by her stage name Jin Di, was a Chinese film actress, television director and screenwriter.

Biography
In 1950, Jin joined the Northeast Anshan City Art Troupe as a dancer. In 1952, she entered the performance department of the Northeast Luxun Academy of Literature and Art and from next year has been an actress of the Northeast People's Art Theater. Since 1958, she started her film career. In 1985, she moved to the fishing village in Shenzhen and two years after - transferred to Shenzhen Satellite TV as a director, filming TV dramas and musicals. In 2019, Jin left Shenzhen and went to Beijing.

Jin Di has been awarded a number of times.

Personal life
Di's husband, Cui Yifeng, was a photographer, who dubbed Gorky in the Soviet film Gorky Trilogy.

Death
Di died of illness in Beijing on 3 April 2022, at the age of 89.

Selected filmography
Blooming Flowers and Full Moon (1958) as Yuan Xiao-Jun
Youth in Our Village (1959) as Kong Shu-Zhen
Beam with Smiles (1959) as Luo Yu-Hua
Youth in Our Village 2 (1963) as Kong Shu-Zhen
My Ten Classmates (1979)
A Love-Forsaken Corner (1981)
Wild Geese Flying To North (1982)
The Wedding Maidens (1990) as Xin Liang
My Wonderful Roommate (2021) as 6800

References

External links
 

1933 births
2022 deaths
Actresses from Shanghai
Chinese film actresses
People from Suzhou